Matthew Fletcher may refer to:

 Matthew Fletcher (mine owner and engineer) (1731–1808), Lancashire mine owner and son of Jacob
 Matthew Fletcher (footballer) (born 1992), Australian association footballer
 Matthew Fletcher, a fictional character in Wentworth
 Matthew (Mad Matt) Fletcher, member of Shai Hulud